Timothy Derickson (born March 20, 1960) is the former state representative for the 53rd District of the Ohio House of Representatives, as well as a former Hanover Township Trustee.

Career
Derickson was born on March 20, 1960 in Cincinnati, Ohio, and after graduation from Clark State University and Miami University, Derickson worked as a health care administrator before starting Colonial Woods Furniture and Indian Ridge Golf Course on land that was previously his family's dairy farm. The former Hanover Township trustee is also a Coldwell Banker realtor.
In April 2017, Derickson was named assistant director at the Ohio Department of Agriculture (ODA). During a portion of his service with ODA, he served as interim director. 
In September 2020, JobsOhio announced the hiring of Tim Derickson, a longtime agribusiness entrepreneur and former state legislator, as its new Senior Director of Food and Agribusiness. In his new role, Derickson oversees a sector that includes hundreds of companies that cultivate, process, package, distribute and market foods and beverages enjoyed around the world.

Ohio House of Representatives
With incumbent Shawn Webster unable to run again due to term limits, Derickson was one of three who sought to replace him. However, in a razor-thin primary victory, Derickson won the Republican nomination by 54 votes.  He faced Democrat Rocky Day in the general election, and won with 65.85% of the electorate.  In his 2010 reelection campaign Derickson, unopposed in the primary, defeated Democrat James Shew with 70.19 of the electorate to take second term.

On May 10, 2011, Derickson announced that he would seek a seat in the Ohio Senate, following Gary Cates resignation. However, the seat ultimately went to Bill Coley.  Derickson won a third term in 2012 with 60.91% of the vote.

On August 15, 2016, Derickson was selected by the Ohio Board of Embalmers and Funeral Directors to lead the state funeral board. Derickson, who was term-limited and could not seek reelection, subsequently announced his resignation from the Ohio House effective August 22, 2016.

Committee assignments
Finance: Agriculture & Development Sub.--Chair
Education
Finance & Appropriations
Manufacturing & Workforce Development

Electoral history

Personal life
Derickson and his wife Kelly live in Oxford, Ohio with their two children, Katie (who is married to Dave Noble) and Matt. Derickson has two grandchildren.

References

1960 births
Living people
21st-century American politicians
Clark State College alumni
Republican Party members of the Ohio House of Representatives